The Heart & Hustle Award is given out annually by the Major League Baseball Players Alumni Association (MLBPAA) to a current player who not only excels on the field, but also "best embodies the values, spirits and traditions of baseball."

Nominations are taken from the alumni of the teams, and the winner is selected via a letter ballot by the members of the MLBPAA. The most recent winner of the Heart & Hustle Award is Paul Goldschmidt.

Winners

Other baseball awards for spirit
The Hutch Award is for the "active player who best exemplifies the fighting spirit and competitive desire to win".
Players Choice Awards Marvin Miller Man of the Year Award – given to "the player in either league whose on-field performance and contributions to his community inspire others to higher levels of achievement."
Players Choice Awards Majestic Athletic Always Game Award
Lou Gehrig Memorial Award – given to a player who best exemplifies his character and integrity both on and off the field.
Tony Conigliaro Award – given to a player who best overcomes an obstacle and adversity through the attributes of spirit, determination and courage.
 The San Francisco Giants have given the Willie Mac Award since 1980 to "the player on the San Francisco Giants who best exemplifies the spirit and leadership consistently shown by Willie McCovey throughout his long career."
The Oakland Athletics have given the Catfish Hunter Award since 2004 to the "player whose play on the field and conduct in the clubhouse best exemplifies the courageous, competitive and inspirational spirit demonstrated by the late ... pitcher, Jim "Catfish" Hunter."
The Los Angeles Dodgers have given the Roy Campanella Award since 2006 to the player who best exemplifies the spirit and leadership of Roy Campanella.

See also

Baseball awards

References

Major League Baseball trophies and awards
Awards established in 2005